Lambula nigra is a moth of the family Erebidae. It was described by van Eecke in 1929. It is found on Buru.

References

 Natural History Museum Lepidoptera generic names catalog

Lithosiina
Moths described in 1929